An equipment room is a room or space within a building for the storage or installation of mechanical or electrical/electronic devices. An equipment room can house telecommunication installations that serves the occupants of the building or multiple buildings in a campus environment. An equipment room is considered distinct from a telecommunications room because it is considered to be a building or campus serving (as opposed to floor serving) facility and because of the nature or complexity of the equipment that it contains.

See also
 Central apparatus room
 Data center
 Server room
 Wiring closet

Rooms